The 2011–12 Scottish Football League First Division, also known as the 2011–12 Irn Bru Scottish Football League First Division for sponsorship reasons, is the 17th season of the Scottish First Division and the 106th season of a second-tier football league in Scotland. Dunfermline Athletic are the current champions. It began on 6 August 2011 and is scheduled to end on 5 May 2012.
The league comprises the teams ranked second through eighth of the 2010–11 season, the relegated side from the 2010–11 Premier League (Hamilton Academical), the 2010–11 Second Division champions, and the winners of the 2010–11 First Division play-off (Livingston and Ayr United respectively).

Teams 

Dunfermline Athletic, champions of the 2010–11 season, were promoted to the 2011–12 Premier League. The club thus completed a five-season tenure in the First Division. Dunfermline were replaced by Hamilton Academical, who were relegated from the 2010–11 Premier League after finishing at the bottom of the table; Hamilton returned to the First Division after three years.

At the bottom end of the table, last-placed Stirling Albion were directly relegated to the 2011–12 Second Division after being promoted to the second tier only one season earlier. They were replaced by the 2010–11 Second Division champions Livingston, who returned to the First Division after two consecutive promotions in two years; the club had previously been demoted for financial irregularities at the end of the 2008–09 season.

An additional place in the league was available via a play-off tournament between the ninth-placed First Division team, Cowdenbeath, and the sides ranked second through to fourth in the Second Division, Ayr United, Forfar Athletic and Brechin City respectively. The tournament was won by Ayr United, who therefore were promoted back to the First Division after a one-year absence; Cowdenbeath hence were relegated, returning to the Second Division after just one season.

Stadia and locations

Personnel and kits

League table

Results 
Teams play each other four times in this league. In the first half of the season each team plays every other team twice (home and away) and then do the same in the second half of the season, for a total of 36 games

First half of season

Second half of season

First Division play-offs
Times are BST (UTC+1)

Semi-finals
The fourth placed team in the Second Division (Airdrie United) will play the ninth placed team in the First Division (Ayr United) and third placed team in the Second Division (Dumbarton) will play the second placed team in the Second Division (Arbroath). The play-offs will be played over two legs, the winning team in each semi-final will advance to the final.

|}

First legs

Second legs

Final
The two semi-final winners will play each other over two legs.  Originally, the winning team only was to be awarded a place in the 2012–13 First Division.  Following the Rangers F.C. administration situation, both teams were awarded places.

First leg

Second leg

Statistics

Top goalscorers

Hat-tricks

Disciplinary by player

Awards

References

External links
Official site
2010–11 Scottish First Division at Soccerway

Scottish First Division seasons
1
2011–12 in Scottish football leagues
Scot